MMTV is a Bulgarian 24/7 online TV channel and website www.mmtvmusic.com first established as a cable and satellite music television channel in 1997. In the early 2000s, MM had a profound impact on the Bulgarian music industry and popular culture with its annual music awards becoming one of the most important events on the modern Bulgarian music scene.

History
MM was created by Krasen Karaychev and Toni Tanov in 1997 as the first Bulgarian television channel to play music videos guided by on-air hosts known as VJs with a television programming similar to MTV's .In 1998  several new faces joined the television (Radoslav Kavaldjiev -Roro, Rumyana Blagoeva -Rumi, Stefka Gagamova - Guti, Vasil Katincharov, Mihail Vuchkov etc) and a lot of TV shows were created which appealed to the younger and more diverse audience. Soon MM expanded into a nationwide cable television channel and the first MM Television Music Awards were held in 1999. They were the most recognised music award given to the local artists until 2008. By the early 2000s, MM Television was broadcast by more than 160 cable and satellite operators in Bulgaria reaching a potential audience of 4.3 million people. In 2003, it started a sister channel - M2, which purpose was to play only music videos performed by Bulgarian bands and artists. In 2005 MM Television also founded its own record label - MM Records.

In 2005 Apace Media Group acquired 66% of the television channel for €660,000. The media company planned to upgrade the TV studios and to continue developing the music-orientated programming. Actually very little of this happened. MM once again changed its ownership in 2007 becoming part of the Balkan Media Group (a joint venture of Apace Media Group and Modern Times Group). 2007 saw major cuts in the television channel's finances as many of the TV shows were discontinued as well as its sister channel M2. In the beginning of 2009 MM dropped all its shows from its programming and started only to broadcast music videos. With its revenues continually falling after the restructuring of MM's programming, in 2010, after 13 years of existence, the channel owners decided to discontinue it as  'it operates in an over-saturated niche market with many other music channels available in the country, while the potential audience tends to change their way to consume music'  (according to the channel's executive director Jacob Anderson's statement in April 2010). After ceasing cable transmission on 30 April 2010, MM Television was replaced by the newly founded sports television channel Nova Sport.

On 10 September 2016 MM Television was relaunched as online TV channel with 24/7 streaming on www.mmtvmusic.com and IPTV/OTT in Bulgaria on Bulsatcom Fusion, Vivacom, SKAT, Net1 and 32 other local IPTV platforms. Worldwide MMTV broadcast can be watched through its partners Neterra, Elemental TV, BG time, TVbg. The new owners of MM Television are former employees of the music channel who spent the last 16 years living and working in London, United Kingdom.
MM New Media Group Ltd acquired the rights for the brand and all merchandise involved.
Since 2017 MMTV online has been media partner of several prominent European festivals like Eurosonic Noorderslag, EXIT Festival and Amsterdam Dance Event. Their production crew has filmed specials from the festivals as well as interviews with popular musicians and DJs. In 2019 MMTV aired a weekend dedicated to the EXIT Festival with a special selection of filmed shows given to the channel by the organisers.

MM's Annual Music Awards
In 1998 MM started organising its own MM's Annual Music Awards. The show soon became one of the most respected events on the modern Bulgarian music scene that gathered the most popular Bulgarian bands and artists each year. The annual music awards were presented until 2007 when a MM's Decennial Music Awards were organised. The event marked the ten-year anniversary of MM's but eventually turned out to be the last show of this kind to be organised by the television channel.

Notes
1.As of 10 September 2016 only online broadcasting.

References

Television networks in Bulgaria
Music organizations based in Bulgaria
Music television channels
Television channels and stations established in 1997